Lubor Niederle (September 20, 1865 – June 14, 1944) was a Czech archeologist, anthropologist and ethnographer. He is seen as one of the founders of modern archeology in Czech lands.

He was born in Klatovy. He studied at the Charles University in Prague from 1883 to 1887. He was initially interested in classical archaeology, then studied anthropology, sociology and ethnology. Later, he studied in Munich under professor Johannes Rank (1889) and in Paris under professor Léonce Manouvriere at the École d’anthropologie. Niederle also travelled in several Slavic countries, studying archaeological findings and historical documents.

In 1898 Niederle was named professor at the Charles University. As archaeologist he had represented the "university school" (univerzitní škola), opposed to the "museum school" (muzejní škola) represented by archaeologist Josef Ladislav Píč.

During 1907–08 Niederle served as a dean of Faculty of Philosophy, during 1908–09 as a vice-dean and during 1927–28 as a rector of the faculty. In 1919 he helped to establish State Archaeological Institute (Státní archeologický ústav), today's Institute of Archaeology (Archeologický ústav). He also published many articles about Slavic ethnography and archaeology and was editor of several specialised journals. Niederle had helped to set up Slavic Institute (Slovanský ústav) in Prague  and directed it from 1928 until 1931.

Among his most-known works are Handbook of Czech Archaeology (Rukověť české archeologie, 1910, with Karel Buchtela) and mainly the eleven-volume series Slavic Antiquities (Slovanské starožitnosti) published between 1902 and 1934. This series exhaustively investigated origin and prehistory of the Slavs, continuing earlier work by historian Pavel Josef Šafařík.

Niederle died on June 14, 1944, in Prague.

References

External links 
 Short biography (in Czech)
 Another biography (in Czech)

1865 births
1944 deaths
Charles University alumni
Academic staff of Charles University
Czech archaeologists
Corresponding members of the Saint Petersburg Academy of Sciences
Corresponding Members of the Russian Academy of Sciences (1917–1925)
Corresponding Members of the USSR Academy of Sciences
Researchers of Slavic religion
Foreign members of the Serbian Academy of Sciences and Arts